Ahmad Kadar Brooks (born March 14, 1984) is an American former football outside linebacker. He played college football at Virginia, and was drafted by the Cincinnati Bengals in the third round of the 2006 NFL Supplemental Draft. He has also played for the San Francisco 49ers and Green Bay Packers.

Early years and personal
Brooks attended C. D. Hylton High School in Woodbridge, Virginia, which he helped lead to two VHSL state championships during his freshman and sophomore year (1998 and 1999). Becoming recognized his team was nationally ranked, going 40-0 before losing to Potomac High School of Woodbridge, Virginia, during his junior season in 2000. Brooks injured his ankle during his junior season, which sidelined him that year. His senior season in 2001 was very productive—he had 202 tackles (144 solo), including 34 for loss, and rushed for 848 yards and 10 touchdowns while averaging 12.6 yards per carry. The semifinal loss to Thomas Dale High School of Chester, Virginia, in 2001 was the only loss in which he played. He was named as the USA Today national high school defensive player of the year after the 2001 season. He participated in the 2002 U.S. Army All-American Bowl game.

Considered a five-star recruit by Rivals.com, Brooks was listed as the number-one middle linebacker in the nation in 2002.

His father, former Washington Redskins defensive tackle Perry Brooks, died in March 2010.

College career
Following high school, Brooks spent one semester at Hargrave Military Academy in Chatham, Virginia, a military post-graduate school, before enrolling in the University of Virginia in the winter of 2003. He earned a starting position on the Virginia Cavaliers football team as a freshman and finished the year with a career-high and team-leading 117 tackles. He also had four sacks, six passes defensed, 10 tackles for loss, and 15 quarterback pressures. He had a career-high 12 tackles vs. Pittsburgh in the Continental Tire Bowl, including a key stop early in the contest to complete a goal-line stand.

During his sophomore year at the University of Virginia, he was one of three Butkus Award finalists, awarded annually to the best college linebacker in the country. He played in 12 games, earning All-America honors after totaling a team-leading 90 tackles with eight sacks, two interceptions, 11 quarterback pressures, and 10 tackles for loss. Brooks earned Atlantic Coast Conference defensive lineman of the week honors for his performance against the Maryland Terrapins. Following his sophomore campaign, Brooks underwent knee surgery.

Brooks missed the first half of his junior year while rehabilitating his knee. He finished the year with 27 tackles (10 solo) and one sack, plus four passes defensed, and five quarterback pressures in only six games. Brooks was dismissed from the Cavalier football team following the 2005 season due to off-field issues.

Professional career

Cincinnati Bengals
Brooks entered the NFL supplemental draft following his junior season at Virginia and was selected by the Bengals in the third round on July 13, 2006. He made his NFL debut September 24 at Pittsburgh (no statistics). As a rookie, he played in 11 contests (games 3-9, 11-12, and 16), with starts at middle linebacker in games 5-9. He had 46 tackles with one sack, 2 passes defended, and one special-teams tackle.

In the 2007 season opener on Monday Night Football against the Baltimore Ravens, Brooks was the starting middle linebacker. Brooks ended the game with six tackles, one sack, and a forced fumble. In the first series of the game against the Cleveland Browns in week 2, Brooks tore his groin muscle, which ended his season.  He was placed on injured reserve on November 7, 2007.

Brooks was waived by the Bengals on August 30, 2008, during the final roster cuts.

San Francisco 49ers
On August 31, 2008, Brooks was claimed off waivers by the San Francisco 49ers.  In week 14, Brooks recorded single-game career-highs of 3 sacks and 2 forced fumbles against the Arizona Cardinals.

Brooks recorded career highs in both tackles (50) and sacks (8) during the 2011 regular season. He led the 49ers into the postseason where they lost to the New York Giants in the NFC Championship.

On February 28, 2012, Brooks signed a six-year contract extension worth $44.5 million, with $17.5 million guaranteed. During the 2012 season, Brooks had 35 tackles, 2 forced fumbles, an interception, 6.5 sacks, and 6 passes defended in 16 games started. He again led the 49ers into the postseason and this time, Super Bowl XLVII but the 49ers lost to the Baltimore Ravens by a score of 31–34.

On November 20, 2013, Brooks was fined $15,750 by the NFL for a controversial roughing-the-passer penalty in which Brooks struck the neck of New Orleans Saints quarterback Drew Brees, the same quarterback off whom he scored his first touchdown. This fine was later overturned.

Brooks was released by the 49ers on August 25, 2017.

Green Bay Packers
On September 3, 2017, Brooks signed a one-year deal with the Green Bay Packers.

NFL statistics

Regular season

Postseason

References

External links

San Francisco 49ers bio
Green Bay Packers bio

1984 births
Living people
Sportspeople from Fairfax County, Virginia
People from Woodbridge, Virginia
African-American players of American football
American football linebackers
Virginia Cavaliers football players
Cincinnati Bengals players
San Francisco 49ers players
Unconferenced Pro Bowl players
Green Bay Packers players
Hargrave Military Academy alumni
21st-century African-American sportspeople
20th-century African-American people